The 2011–12 Swiss Challenge League was the ninth season of the Swiss Challenge League, the second tier of the Swiss football league pyramid. It began on 22 July 2011 and ended on 23 May 2012. The champions of this season, St. Gallen, earned promotion to the 2012–13 Super League. The runners-up Aarau won the promotion/relegation playoff against the 9th-placed team of the 2011–12 Super League, AC Bellinzona. The bottom five teams, Stade Nyonnais, Étoile Carouge, Delémont, Kriens and Brühl were all relegated to partly form the newly created 1. Liga Promotion.

Teams
2010–11 Challenge League champions FC Lausanne-Sport were promoted to the 2011–12 Super League. They were replaced by St. Gallen, who were relegated after finishing the 2010–11 Super League in last place. 2010–11 Challenge League runners-up Servette had to compete in a promotion/relegation playoff against 9th-placed Super League team AC Bellinzona and were promoted (hence exchanging leagues) after winning 3–2 on aggregate.

FC Schaffhausen as 15th-placed team and last-placed Yverdon-Sport FC were relegated after the 2010–11 season. They were replaced by SC Brühl and Étoile Carouge FC, who were promoted from 1. Liga.

League table

Results
Teams played each other twice over the course of the season, home and away, for a total of 30 matches per team.

Top scorers

 Updated 4 July 2012
 Source Soccerway

References

External links
 Swiss Challenge League
  Soccerway

Swiss Challenge League
2011–12 in Swiss football
Swiss Challenge League seasons